Eacles kaechi is a moth in the family Saturniidae. It is found in Ecuador.

References

Ceratocampinae
Moths described in 2011